Dariush Movahedi (born 5 January 1950) is an Iranian water polo player. He competed in the men's tournament at the 1976 Summer Olympics.

References

External links
 

1950 births
Living people
Iranian male water polo players
Olympic water polo players of Iran
Water polo players at the 1976 Summer Olympics
People from Abadan, Iran
Asian Games gold medalists for Iran
Asian Games medalists in water polo
Water polo players at the 1974 Asian Games
Medalists at the 1974 Asian Games
Sportspeople from Khuzestan province
20th-century Iranian people